The Catholic Diocese of Most Holy Trinity in Almaty is a diocese located in the city of Almaty in the Ecclesiastical province of Mary Most Holy in Astana in Kazakhstan.

History
 July 7, 1999: Established as Apostolic Administration of Almaty from the Apostolic Administration of Kazakhstan
 May 17, 2003: Promoted as Diocese of Most Holy Trinity in Almaty

Leadership
 Apostolic Administrators of Almaty (Roman rite)
 Bishop Henry Theophilus Howaniec, O.F.M. (July 7, 1999 – May 17, 2003)
 Bishops of Most Holy Trinity in Almaty (Roman rite)
 Bishop Henry Theophilus Howaniec, O.F.M. (May 17, 2003 – March 5, 2011)
 Bishop José Luís Mumbiela Sierra (since March 5, 2011)

See also
Catholic Church in Kazakhstan

Sources
 GCatholic.org
 Catholic Hierarchy
 The Catholic Church in Kazakhstan

Roman Catholic dioceses in Kazakhstan
Christian organizations established in 1999
Roman Catholic dioceses and prelatures established in the 20th century
1999 establishments in Kazakhstan